Besant Theosophical School (BTS), also known as Besant Theosophical High School, is a boys' school in Kamachha, Varanasi (India). It was established in 1939 in memory of Annie Besant a prominent theosophist and founder of the Central Hindu College in 1898, which became the nucleus of the Benares Hindu University in 1916.

History
In 1913, The Theosophical Educational Trust (ref Theosophical Society) was established. Along with establishing several schools for boys and girls (separately) in India, several other schools were handed over to the trust. In the present location in Kamachha, two different schools existed (Rajghat Besant School & Vasanta College for Women) and were later moved to Rajghat, Varanasi in 1928 & 1954 respectively.

In their place, the Besant Theosophical School for Boys and the Vasant Kanya Mahavidyalaya for girls were started in 1939 and 1954 respectively. A Montessori School called Annie Besant Shishu Vihar also exists on the campus. There is co-education up to class V and separate education for boys up to high-school level and for girls up to degree level (affiliated to BHU).

Noted alumni
Kanhaiya Lal Misra: Advocate General of Uttar Pradesh
Mani Ratnam: Indian Film director, Screenwriter, and Producer

See also
Annie Besant
Besant Theosophical College
List of educational institutions in Varanasi

References

Boys' schools in India
High schools and secondary schools in Uttar Pradesh
Schools in Varanasi
Educational institutions established in 1939
1939 establishments in India
Monuments and memorials to Annie Besant